Now TV (also stylised as now TV) is a pay-TV service provider in Hong Kong operated by PCCW Media Limited, a wholly owned subsidiary of PCCW. Launched on 26 September 2003, its TV signal is transmitted with IPTV technology through HKT's fixed broadband network.

It provides 197 TV channels including 176 channels branded under now TV (32 channels in HD), 21 channels from TVB Network Vision (1 channel in HD), and over 30 video on demand categories.

Now TV is the largest pay-TV operator in Hong Kong in terms of number of subscribers, number of channels, number of HD channels and quantity of VOD contents. The word "Now" is abbreviated from "Network Of the World".

History and establishment
Launched in March 1998, PCCW's services included a wide range of information and entertainment, such as news, video-on-demand (VOD), music videos, home-shopping, home-banking and educational content. iTV had some 67,000 subscribers at the end of 2000.

Due to the liberalization of the pay-TV market by the HKSAR government in early July 2000, the then existing duopolists, iTV and i-Cable, were confronted with ferocious competition. With fewer subscribers and hence the decline in the revenue generated from iTV, the interactive television operation was terminated in the final quarter of 2002. Now Broadband pay-TV service was launched in September 2003 with 23 channels under the same umbrella company PCCW; iTV is thus commonly viewed as the predecessor of Now TV.

In December 2005, Now TV introduced a technology with connection speed up to 18 megabits per second (Mbit/s). At least 75% of the service area will be offered a service running up to 8Mbit/s. In addition, Video-On-Demand services were launched in January 2006.

Now TV subscribers have access to 136 channels.

Chronology
March 1998 Hong Kong Telecom commercially launched iTV
July 2000 Liberalisation of the pay-TV market
Last quarter of 2002 Termination of iTV
August 2003 Now TV was unveiled
September 2003 Now TV was officially launched

Charging schemes
Since each household has to install a special decoder to view the channels, there is an extra deposit and installation for the decoder. However, these charges are waived for Netvigator broadband subscribers. With the decoder, households are able to watch approximately 20 free channels.

For the subscription channels, Now uses the pricing model of pay-per-channel basis. There are bundle offers in existence, for given bouquet of channels, but these are less comprehensive than those offered by rivals.

Now TV offers a business package (in which there are fewer channels for subscription than household customers) for businesses at a higher price than household subscribers.

Since 1 September 2007, Now TV no longer offers STAR Sports or ESPN as stand-alone packages, preferring instead to bundle them into a single multi-sport package. This has caused some distress amongst many viewers who view this move as a breach of their commitment contract's that stipulates that upon expiry of channel contracts, contracts are automatically renewed.

Channel highlights
In the beginning, Now TV only operated 23 channels, most of which were in English. In response to competition, it has expanded its repertoire of new channels, adding programming such as the Disney Channel and ESPN. By June 2005, the number of channels grew to more than 70, with an increased number of Cantonese channels.

In 2006, Now TV outbid i-Cable for the rights to broadcast English Premier League football in Hong Kong, starting with the 2007–2008 season.
It is also the broadcaster of LaLiga, the Spanish football competition

Now TV currently has the most channels of any pay TV provider in Hong Kong. At present, it offers 21 free channels and 103 pay channels, including 15 audio channels. The total number of channels exceeds 130.

Languages of channels provided
The majority of its programming is in English, Cantonese or Putonghua, though some programming in Hindi (Star Bharat), and French (TV5MONDE),  is available.

Business performance and development
Now TV service was launched with 23 channels in September 2003 but was soon expanded to exceed 30 with the addition of sports-related channels and BBC World and the Animax channel, as well as the Cantonese-language Star Chinese Movies and Xing Kong channels. Within four months of launch, Now TV had attracted more than 200,000 customers by end-2003.

According to a report in Ming Pao Finance on 5 October 2005, the number of subscribers to Now TV exceeded 450,000. Per annual reports issued by PCCW, at the end of December 2005 the number of paying subscribers to Now TV stood at 549,000 (approximately 61% were paid subscribers, with 31% being free subscribers). These figures compare with totals of 361,000 at end-December 2004 and 269,000 at end-June 2004. Despite the growth in subscribers, Now TV was operating at a loss in 2005. By August 2006, Now TV had in excess of 654,000 subscribers.

Strategy
In early July 2000, the HKSAR government awarded five new pay-TV licences. The new entrants were all relatively seasoned broadcasting companies including Galaxy Satellite Broadcasting, Hong Kong DTV Company, a British broadcaster Elmsdsale, Hong Kong Network TV and Pacific Digital Media HK. The opening of the market sparked intense competition for programming and viewer share.

To avoid direct competition with the two local digital terrestrial channels - Television Broadcasts Limited (TVB) and ViuTV - Now TV sought to build up and secure its local pay-TV position by signing long-term contracts with a variety of channels from around the world.

Exclusivity
On November 15, 2006, Now TV made a knock-out bid, of an estimated HK$1.56 billion, to secure the license to exclusively broadcast football matches of the Barclays Premier League matches in Hong Kong for three seasons commencing from the 2007–2008 season. Two years previously, i-Cable had paid an estimated HK$700 million for a three-year contract.
Now TV announced in January 2006 that a three-year deal was signed with ESPN STAR for the rights to live matches of the UEFA Champions League during the 2006–2009 seasons.
In December 2006 secured the exclusive rights to broadcast the Euro 2008 football championship by agreeing to pay HK$400 million.
Playboy TV will become exclusive to Now TV from December 1, 2006.

Pricing
i-Cable has been forced to adopt an alternative pricing model for its subscribers. It allows subscribers to pick and choose their own channels, similar to the pay-by-channel of Now. Moreover, from Asia Media in October 2005, Now TV claimed that they will not follow i-Cable to minimize monthly charges since they have added new channels and improved the delivery standard, in order to maintain competitiveness. In December 2006, it announced it was instead planning on raising subscription rates after having secured exclusive rights in the ESPN, Premier League, and Euro 2008.

Awards

At the 2004 Convention of CASBAA (Cable and Satellite Broadcasting Association of Asia), Now TV was awarded "The Chairman's Award". CASBAA, representing 120 corporations serving more than 3 billion viewers, acknowledged Now TV for its "innovative and proactive marketing of a secure and advanced pay-TV platform and for growing its interactive capability, resulting in a stellar subscriber take-up" on 31 October 2004.

See also
IPTV
HK Television Entertainment
Viu
ViuTV
ViuTVsix

References

External links

Television stations in Hong Kong
Streaming television
Television channels and stations established in 1998